Danny Baldwin is a fictional character from the British ITV soap opera Coronation Street, portrayed by Bradley Walsh. The character first appeared on 31 May 2004 and made his departure on 31 December 2006.

Storylines
Danny Baldwin moves to Weatherfield to help his uncle Mike Baldwin (Johnny Briggs) with his business, Underworld. Not long afterwards, his wife Frankie Baldwin (Debra Stephenson), who had previously cheated on him, arrives in Weatherfield as she wants to give their marriage another chance. They are soon joined by Danny's two sons, Warren Baldwin (Danny Young) and Jamie Baldwin (Rupert Hill). Unaware of Frankie's intentions, Danny has a brief fling with shop assistant Sunita Parekh (Shobna Gulati) shortly after his arrival, but Sunita does not know that Danny is married and is very hurt when Frankie turns up. The Baldwins then rent No. 7 Coronation Street from Blanche Hunt (Maggie Jones).

Danny's supposed father Harry dies, and his mother, Viv, (Patricia Brake), comes to stay and reveals to Mike and Danny a secret she had kept since his birth: Harry's brother Mike is actually Danny's biological father, the product of an affair. Adding to this revelation is Danny finding out that Harry had brought him up at the thought that he was his own son. Danny soon embarks on a passionate affair with Jamie's girlfriend Leanne Battersby (Jane Danson). When this is finally revealed, Jamie is heartbroken. Frankie throws Danny out and he moves in with Leanne.

Mike becomes ill with Alzheimer's disease. Danny is initially determined to use Mike's illness to gain control of the factory and Mike's other assets and manages to get power of attorney; however, as Mike's condition deteriorates, Danny's emotions get the better of him and he is genuinely upset at the decline of his dad. Mike eventually dies in April 2006, and Danny is left distraught by the outcome. Leanne, now engaged to Danny, finds a more recent will amongst Mike's belongings in which he leaves everything to his youngest son, Adam Barlow (Sam Robertson). Thereafter Leanne uses the will to blackmail Danny, demanding £100,000 and leaves Weatherfield after Danny throws her out. Danny continues to try to reconcile with Frankie, and nearly succeeds; but is shocked and appalled to discover that Frankie is having an affair with Jamie. Afterwards, Danny goes on a downwards spiral and sells his share of the factory to Paul Connor (Sean Gallagher) - who had already bought Adam's share - and leaves Weatherfield for Spain. He is last seen with a beautiful woman on his arm, where he phones Jamie to wish him a Happy New Year.

Creation and development
In an interview with Chris Evans on OFI Sunday on 11 December 2005, Bradley Walsh revealed that the character was originally to have been called "Vic Baldwin", but that he asked the producers if the name could be changed to that of his own father, who had recently died.

References

External links

Coronation Street characters
Fictional businesspeople
Fictional people from London
Television characters introduced in 2004
Male characters in television
Bradley Walsh